Stargirl or Star Girl may refer to:

Stargirl (novel), a 2000 young adult novel by Jerry Spinelli
Stargirl (film), a movie based on the Spinelli novel
Love, Stargirl, a 2007 young adult novel by Jerry Spinelli
Stargirl (TV series), a 2020 American superhero drama streaming television series
Courtney Whitmore, the DC Comics superhero Stargirl and the basis of the TV series
Star Girls, a manhua comics magazine

Music
"Star Girl" (song), a song by McFly
The Star Girls, an Australian pop band
"Stargirl Interlude", a song by The Weeknd featuring Lana Del Rey

See also